Patricia Pérez may refer to:
 Patricia Pérez (footballer) (born 1979), Mexican footballer
 Patricia Pérez (rhythmic gymnast) (born 2004), Spanish gymnast
 Patricia Pérez (television presenter) (born 1973), Spanish actress, presenter and writer
 Patricia Pérez Goldberg (born 1974), Chilean lawyer and politician